James Fleming (1741 – 21 December 1829) was an Irish-born farmer, businessman and political figure in Nova Scotia. He represented Londonderry Township in the Nova Scotia House of Assembly from 1811 to 1826.

He was born in 1741 in Derry (Londonderry),  Ireland. In 1766, he married Isabel Vance at Masstown in Colchester County, NS. Fleming was a justice of the peace. He died in Lower Debert, Nova Scotia.

References 
 A Directory of the Members of the Legislative Assembly of Nova Scotia, 1758-1958, Public Archives of Nova Scotia (1958)

1741 births
1839 deaths
Irish emigrants to pre-Confederation Nova Scotia
Nova Scotia pre-Confederation MLAs
People from Colchester County
Politicians from County Londonderry